The 2018 Chesapeake Bayhawks season was the eighteenth season for the Chesapeake Bayhawks of Major League Lacrosse, and ninth using the Chesapeake moniker (the team was previously the Baltimore Bayhawks and the Washington Bayhawks). The Bayhawks came into the year looking to improve upon their 7–7 finish in 2017 in which they finished sixth place in the league and missed out on the playoffs for the fourth consecutive year. General manager Dave Cottle returned to the sidelines as head coach for the first time since 2015 after the Bayhawks and Brian Reese parted ways in September. In Cottle's first year back on the sidelines, the Bayhawks finished 9–5 and second place in the league. In their return to the postseason, the Bayhawks lost to the Denver Outlaws in the semifinal round, 13–12.

Offseason
September 14, 2017 - Head coach Brian Reese and the Bayhawks part ways. In two seasons, Reese led Chesapeake to a 15–13 record but no playoff appearances.
November 30 - Bayhawks ownership made their plans of a new 10,000-seat stadium official. The three-phase project would be located in Crownsville, Maryland at the site of a defunct hospital and include 20 multiuse fields, an entertainment and restaurant district, and 6,000-seat amphitheater.
December 13 - General manager Dave Cottle is announced the Bayhawks' head coach for 2018. Cottle coached the Bayhawks to a 30–26 record and two championships from 2012 to 2015.
February 20, 2018 - The team announces its June 2 game against the Ohio Machine will be the nightcap of a doubleheader featuring the Baltimore Brave and the Philadelphia Fire of the newly founded Women's Professional Lacrosse League.

Transactions
October 3, 2017 - The Bayhawks received attackman Steele Stanwick from the Ohio Machine in exchange for a second-round draft pick in the 2019 collegiate draft.

Regular season
May 3 - The Bayhawks secure a unique partnership with NBC Sports Washington in which the station will broadcast all Bayhawks games, both home and away, on a tape delay basis.

Schedule

Postseason

Standings

References

External links
 Team Website 

Major League Lacrosse seasons
Chesapeake Bayhawks